Thomas Andrews (born before 1540), of Dover, Kent, was an English politician.

He was a Member of Parliament (MP) for Dover in 1571 and 1572.

References

16th-century births
Year of death missing
Members of the Parliament of England for Dover
English MPs 1571
English MPs 1572–1583